Stavroula is a Greek given name. Notable people with the given name include:

 Stavroula Antonakou (born 1982), Greek water polo player
 Stavroula Constantinou (born 1975), Greek academic
 Stavroula Kozompoli (born 1974), Greek water polo player and Olympian
 Stavroula Mili, Greek molecular biologist
 Stavroula Samara (born 1994), Greek rhythmic gymnast and Olympian
 Stavroula Tsolakidou (born 2000), Greek chess player
 Stavroula Zygouri (born 1964), Greek freestyle wrestler

Given names of Greek language origin